Banar River is a river in Faridpur, Jamalpur and Mymensingh of north-central Bangladesh.

References

Rivers of Bangladesh
Rivers of Dhaka Division